Mark Okey is a former Democratic member of the Ohio House of Representatives for the 61st district. He first took office in 2007, and was re-elected in 2008 and 2010. He opted not to run for a 3rd term in 2012.

Okey has a history degree from Kent State University and a law degree from Ohio Northern University, and is married with three children. He also works as an attorney in a legal practice founded by his father.

References

Living people
Democratic Party members of the Ohio House of Representatives
Kent State University alumni
Claude W. Pettit College of Law alumni
21st-century American politicians
People from Carrollton, Ohio
Year of birth missing (living people)